The Scania-Vabis L55/L56/L66 was a series of trucks produced by Swedish automaker Scania-Vabis between 1959 and 1968.

Scania-Vabis L55 
In the spring of 1958, Scania-Vabis introduced the L75 model. It was the first vehicle in a new generation of trucks, with newly designed six-cylinder engines, stronger chassis components and a new, more spacious and comfortable cab. The cab would be used for all conventional trucks until 1980. In the summer of 1959 Scania-Vabis presented the smaller L55, with a seven-litre engine. The truck was also offered with a trailing axle. This version was called the LS55, with an “S” for "support axle". All L55 series trucks came with air brakes, but power steering was still an option.

Scania-Vabis L56 
In the autumn of 1962 the improved L56/LS56 series was introduced, with an eight-litre engine and dual circuits brakes.

Scania-Vabis L66 
In the spring of 1963 Scania-Vabis introduced the L66 truck. This vehicle combined the strong chassis from the L76 series, built for heavy duty, with the smaller engine from the L56 series. The L66 was mainly intended for export, but was also sold on the domestic market.

Engines

Gallery

References

External links 

 Scania Group - history
 Swedish brass cars - picture gallery

L55
Vehicles introduced in 1959